WHEM may refer to:

 WHEM (FM), a radio station (91.3 FM) licensed to Eau Claire, Wisconsin, United States
 The Western Hemisphere, a geographical term for the half of the Earth that lies west of the Prime Meridian.